Sakharam Bapu Bokil (also referred as Sakharam Bapu, Sakharam Hari Bokil or Sakharam Bhau), born Sakharam Bhagwant Bokil, was an influential minister, a diplomat and statesman of the Maratha Empire during the Peshwa administration in Pune, India. Before joining Peshwa administration of Pune, Sakharam was Kulkarni of Hivare.

In Maharashtra and Hyderabad, there were three and half great men-or wise diplomats. The three and a half wise men were popularly known as Devā, Sekhyā, Yitthe and Nānā. Devā stood for Devāśipant, Sakhyā for Sakhārām Băpu Bokil, Vitthal for Vithal Sundar at the Court of the Nizām and Nānā for the famous Nana Phadnis. Vitthal Sundar was with the Nizam and died in the famous battle of Rakshasbhuvan on 10 August 1763. Devajipant Chorghade of Narkhed and the other two and half wise men were in Poona and Nagpur. Sakharam Bapu Bokil was one full wise man while Nana Phadnis was a half wise man.
he was a kulkarni of Hivre village
given as prize to his ancestor Pantaji Gopinath.
He was a clerk with Mahadji Purandare.
He died at Raigadh.

Early life
Sakharam Bapu was born into Deshastha Brahmin family. He is descendend from Pantoji Gopinath, who had helped Shivaji to defeat Afzal Khan at Pratapgad. Sakaram Bapu is the son of Somnath Raoji, who was Dabir and foreign minister of Maratha Empire and the incharge of the Berar conquests, who also served in the Konkan wars. Sakaram Bapu was the favourite commander and friend of Raghunathrao Peshwa.

References

18th-century Indian people
Peshwa dynasty